Mentzelia albicaulis is a species of flowering plants in the family Loasaceae known by the common names whitestem blazingstar, white-stemmed stickleaf, and small flowered blazing star. It is native to much of western North America, where it grows in mountain, desert, and plateau habitat.

Description
It is an annual herb producing a stem up to 42 centimeters long, sometimes growing erect. The leaves are up to 11 centimeters long in the basal rosette, divided into even comblike lobes, and smaller farther up on the plant. The flower has five shiny yellow petals 2 to 7 millimeters long each. The fruit is a narrow, straight or curving utricle 1 to 3 centimeters long. It contains many angular seeds covered in tiny bumps.

References

External links
Calflora Database: Mentzelia albicaulis (Small flowered Blazing Star,  White stemmed stickleaf, white stemmed blazing star)
Jepson Manual eFlora (TJM2) treatment of Mentzelia albicaulis
UC Photos gallery — Mentzelia albicaulis

albicaulis
Flora of the Western United States
Flora of Western Canada
Flora of Arizona
Flora of Baja California
Flora of the California desert regions
Flora of Nevada
Flora of the Great Basin
Flora of the Sonoran Deserts
Natural history of the California chaparral and woodlands
Natural history of the Colorado Desert
Natural history of the Mojave Desert
Flora without expected TNC conservation status